Max Springer (19 December 1877 – 20 January 1954) was a German organist, composer and music educator .

Life 
Springer grew up in the municipality of Schwendi, Baden-Württemberg. He was initially a pupil of the Beuron Archabbey and came to Prague as organist of the St. Emmaus Monastery, a branch of the Beuron Monastery, where he studied at the German university with, among others, Antonín Dvořák and Josef Klička. As early as 1910, he taught composition at the Wiener Musikakademie, and in 1923 he was appointed full professor and received the title of "Hofrat". In 1926, he became director of the University of Music and Performing Arts Vienna. The municipality of Schwendi made him an honorary citizen in 1933. Among his students were Johann Bauernfeind, Kurt Wöss, Erwin Weiss, Karl Josef Walter, Marko Tajčević, and Anton Nowakowski.

Springer died in Vienna at the age of 76.

Work 
 Sechs Fughetten über den Namen BACH op. 14. Coppenrath-Verlag, Regensburg, 1908
 8 Postludien über die gebräuchlichsten Ite missa est. op. 20
 4 Präludien und eine Fantasie über das Oster-Halleluja op. 21
 Missa "Lauda Sion" op. 22
 Te deum, op. 28, für gemischten Chor und Orgelbegleitung, Bonifatius-Druckerei, Prag, 1914
 Messe zu Ehren der seligen Crescentia Höss op. 31
 Kleine Präludien für Orgel op. 35
 Konzert für Violine und Orgel op. 40

Further reading 
 Heinz Lohmann: Handbuch der Orgelliteratur (Breitkopf & Härtel, 1975/ 1980)
 Bruno Weigl: Handbuch der Orgelliteratur (F. E. G. Leuckart, Leipzig, 1931)
 Max Hammer: Schwendi. Heimatbuch einer Gemeinde in Oberschwaben (Anton H. Konrad Verlag, Weißenhorn 1969)
 Genialer Orgelvirtuose und begnadeter Komponist. Zeitungsartikel der Schwäbischen Zeitung vom 31. Januar 2004
 Komponistenbeschreibung in „Größere und kleinere Orgelwerke“ op. 54C Johannes Diebold (Pustet, Regensburg, 1910)
 Klaus Beckmann: Repertorium Orgelmusik (Schott, Mainz, 2001)

References

External links 
 

German music educators
German classical organists
20th-century German composers
1877 births
1954 deaths
People from Württemberg